The Kaleshwar Temple in Nerur, India is devoted to the God Shri Kaleshwar, an Avatar of the God Shiva. 

There is an ancient temple of Shri Kaleshwar in the Village Nerur, Dist. Sindhudurg, Maharashtra. Shri Kaleshwar is the Village Deity (Gramdevta) of all Nerurkars.

External links
 http://newconsys.com/kaleshwar.html
 

Hindu temples in Maharashtra
Sindhudurg district